The fourteen narrow gauge railways of the Nemours sand pits (French: Réseau des Sablières de Nemours), with a total length of about  and three different gauges of ,  and , ran from several sand pits and underground mines to a depot in Saint-Pierre-lès-Nemours and from there to the Canal du Loing in Nemours.

History 
The sand of the Nemours Basin was mined in the 20th century by several family-owned companies for glass production and as molding sand for foundries. Initially, horse-drawn railroads were laid on portable tracks made of prefabricated track sections with metal sleepers. They were later replaced by permanently laid rails on wooden sleepers as more powerful and heavier locomotives were used to increase profitability.

Route of the light railway lines 
The light railway line from the Bonnevault and Gondonnieres sand pits to Saint Pierre-les-Nemours was the most important one in the area and probably one of the oldest. The quarry appears to have been established around 1857 and the light railway before 1885. It was demolished around 1966 or 1967.

The Bellefille family light railway line continued south from the Les Brûlis and Les Vieilles Vignes sand pits near Ormesson to Nemours. To get there, the train had to reverse through the streets of Saint-Pierre-les-Nemours, cross the SNCF tracks, pass a small stone viaduct, and finally arrive at a large steel loading ramp on the canal bank. The last section of track was removed around 1950, after which lorries carried the sand between from the depot to the canal. The Bellefille company that operated these sand pits was bought out by the Destalle glass factory on the Meuse, which used a lot of sand. The operation was managed by the sand pit in Nemours until it was discontinued around 1965. The line was operated with six wheel steam locomotives built in 1908, as well as a large three-axle Campagne diesel locomotive and a Plymouth. Later, other smaller Campagne locomotives were used for shunting at the depot. The tipping cars were all wooden, very short, and could only be tipped in one direction (Girafe type).

External links 
 Trains : les photos de Jacques Bazin. Page 6.
 Trains : les photos de Jacques Bazin. Page 7.
 Trains : les photos de Jacques Bazin. Page 8.
 Chemins de fer disparus 24.

References 

Railway lines in Île-de-France
500 mm gauge railways in France
600 mm gauge railways in France
800 mm gauge railways
Seine-et-Marne